Racinaea dyeriana is a species of plant in the family Bromeliaceae. It is endemic to Ecuador.  Its natural habitat is subtropical or tropical mangrove forests. It is threatened by habitat loss.

References

dyeriana
Endemic flora of Ecuador
Critically endangered flora of South America
Taxonomy articles created by Polbot